Roop — Mard Ka Naya Swaroop (Roop — New Form of Man) is an Indian television show that aired on Colors TV. It premiered on 28 May 2018 and ended on 17 May 2019. Produced by Rashmi Sharma Telefilms Limited, it starred Shashank Vyas and Donal Bisht.

Roop — Mard Ka Naya Swaroop challenges stereotypes and aims to redefine the new age man, who doesn't consider being sensitive a sign of femininity.

Plot
Roopendra "Roop" Singh Vaghela is an eight-year-old boy who deals with patriarchal norms of society. He likes cooking, washing and sewing the clothes which are considered female jobs by the orthodox society. Shamsher doesn't want Roop to stay with the women of the house so he decides to send Roop away to a military boarding school.

15 years later
Roop returns home and decides to oppose Shamsher's misogynistic views. Roop meets Ishika Patel and falls in love with her. Ranveer, on the other hand, gets attracted to Ishika's beauty and wants to possess her. Roop ends up marrying Ishika while trying to save her from Ranveer. Ishika doesn't trust Roop at first, but later falls for him. Ranveer seeks revenge and kidnaps Ishika. Shamsher kills Ranveer while protecting Roop and Ishika.

Then Ranveer's brother come to take revenge. Fai baa and Ranveer's brother Shambhu take revenge from shamsher.
Shambhu was taken to jail and Shamsher is taken out from jail. Shamsher starts drinking a lot of 'sharab' and tries to sucied but roopendra saves him.
Roops behaviour changes he starts drinking.

Cast

Main
 Shashank Vyas as Roopendra "Roop" Singh Vaghela – Shamsher and Kamla's son; Kinjal, Himani and Jigna's brother; Ishika's husband (2018–19)
 Affan Khan as Young Roopendra "Roop" (2018)
 Donal Bisht as Ishika Singh Vaghela – Kanchan and Rupesh's daughter; Roop's wife (2018–19)

Recurring
 Yash Tonk as Shamsher Singh Vaghela – Baisa's brother; Kamla's husband; Himani, Jigna, Kinjal and Roop's father (2018–19)
 Mitali Nag as Kamlesh "Kamla" Vaghela – Shamsher's wife; Himani, Jigna, Kinjal and Roop's mother (2018–19)
 Neil Bhatt as Ranveer Singh Vaghela – The son of Shamsher's brother; Samru's brother; Ishika's suitor (2018–19)
 Ishant Bhanushali as Young Ranveer Singh Vaghela (2018)
 Mohammad Nazim as Samru Singh Vaghela – The son of Shamsher's brother; Ranveer's brother (2019)
 Dharti Bhatt as Sewa – Roop's suitor (2019)
 Sumati Singh as Purvi Patel – Ishika's cousin sister (2018–19)
 Kritika Sharma as Kinjal Singh Vaghela – Shamsher and Kamla's daughter; Roop, Jigna and Himani's sister (2018–19)
 Tasheen Shah as Young Kinjal Singh Vaghela (2018)
 Shubhanshi Singh as Jigna Singh Vaghela – Shamsher and Kamla's daughter; Roop, Kinjal and Himani's sister (2018–19)
 Ananya Agarwal as Young Jigna Singh Vaghela (2018)
 Nikki Sharma/Aanchal Khurana as Himani Suryavanshi – Shamsher and Kamla's daughter; Roop, Jigna and Kinjal's sister; Himanshu's wife (2018–19)
 Chandni Bhagwanani as Palak Goradia – Roop's best friend and lover (2018–2019)
 Pakhi Mendola as Young Palak (2018)
 Nikhil Sahany as Hardik (2018)
 Gaurav Sharma as Himanshu Suryavanshi – Himani's husband (2018–2019)
 Vaishali Thakkar as Kaushalya "Baisa" Singh Vaghela (2018–2019)
 Swati Shah as Kanchan Patel – Rupesh's wife; Ishika's mother (2018–2019)
 Jagat Rawat as Rupesh Patel – Kanchan's husband; Ishika's father (2018–2019)
 Rahul Manchanda as Dhaval Patel – Ishika's cousin brother (2018–2019)
 Shraddha Jaiswal as Romila Patel (2018–2019)
 Neha Narang as Vaishnavi Patel (2018–2019)
 Mandar Jadhav as Praful Patel – Ishika's cousin brother (2018–2019)
 Rasik Dave and then Shakti Singh as Haren Patel –  Rupesh's brother; Ishika's uncle; Dhaval and Praful's father (2018–2019)
 Alpana Buch as Ishika's aunt; Dhaval and Praful's mother (2018–2019)
 Aashish Kaul as Jeetu Goradia – Shamsher's friend; Palak's father (2018)
 Falaq Naaz as Minal – Teacher (2018)
 Anil Dhawan as Roop, Himani, Jigna and Kinjal's maternal grandfather
 Pavitra Punia as S.P. Durga Agarwal: Shamsher's senior colleague (2018)

Special appearances
Hina Khan as Herself
Sanjeeda Sheikh as Herself

References

External links
 Mard Ka Naya Swaroop on IMDb

Indian drama television series
Hindi-language television shows
2018 Indian television series debuts
2019 Indian television series endings
Colors TV original programming